Easterly may refer to anything facing, located in, or coming from, the East, particularly:

 Easterlies, the trade winds which blow primarily east-to-west in tropical regions

People
Catharine F. Easterly (born 1970), American judge in Washington, D.C.
Chris Easterly, American screenwriter
Dick Easterly (born 1939), American football player
Harry Easterly (1922–2005), American golf administrator
Jamie Easterly (born 1953), American baseball player
Jen Easterly (born 1968), American intelligence officer
Ted Easterly (1885–1951), American baseball player
Thomas Martin Easterly (1809–1882), American photographer
William Easterly (born 1957), American economist

Places
Easterly, Texas, an unincorporated community in Robertson County, Texas

See also

Easterly wave, a type of atmospheric trough
 
 
Easter (disambiguation)
East (disambiguation)